Hilton is a small village in Berwickshire, Scottish Borders, Scotland.

See also
List of places in the Scottish Borders
List of places in Scotland

References

Villages in the Scottish Borders